Femina Miss India Delhi is beauty pageant in India whose winners compete nationally in Femina Miss India pageant. The first Femina Miss India Delhi was Meri jaanki  of udairamsar.
The reigning Femina Miss India Delhi is Supriya Dahiya. She represented Delhi at Femina Miss India 2020, where was one of the Top 15 state finalists.

Titleholders

Runners Up
After 2016 no runner up status were awarded. Top 3 finalists will be short listed during the Delhi audition and they will compete for Femina Miss India Delhi title at North Zonals since 2017. The winner will represent the National Capital Region, Delhi at Femina Miss India finals.

Performance at Femina Miss India
Color keys

Femina Miss India Delhi 1st Runner Up

Femina Miss India Delhi 2nd Runner Up

Delegates' notes
 Anukriti Gusain, Femina Miss India Delhi 2013, later represented India at Miss Asia Pacific World 2014(May edition) and was crowned 4th Runner Up at the pageant. Again she participated in Femina Miss India 2017 and won Miss Grand India 2017 title. She represented India in Miss Grand International 2017 and was one among the Top 20 Semifinalist.
 Vijaya Sharma, Femina Miss India Delhi 2013 1st Runner Up and Femina Miss India Supranational 2013 later won Elite Model Look India 2014.
 Srishti Rana, Femina Miss India Delhi 2013 2nd Runner Up, later competed in Miss Diva 2013 pageant and was crowned Miss Diva Asia Pacific World 2013, the same year she represented India at Miss Asia Pacific World 2013 and was crowned the winner. She became second Indian and Asian woman to win the crown.
 Koyal Rana, Femina Miss India Delhi 2014, was Scooty Miss Teen Diva 2008, Miss Teen India 2008 and Fact Miss Universal Teen 2009.
 Apeksha Porwal, Femina Miss India Delhi 2015, was Scooty Miss Teen Diva 2009. She later on participated in Miss Diva - 2017 and adjudged as second runner up

Photographs of some notable winners

Image:Koyalrana.jpg|Koyal Rana, Femina Miss India Delhi 2014, Winner of Femina Miss India 2014.  Top 11 semifinalist at Miss World 2014

References

Femina Miss India
Female models from Delhi
Beauty pageants in India
2013 establishments in Delhi
Indian awards
Women in Delhi